Němčičky may refer to:

Places in the Czech Republic
 Němčičky (Břeclav District)
 Němčičky (Brno-Country District)
 Němčičky (Znojmo District)

People
 Tomáš Němčický, Slovak ice hockey player
 Pavel Němčický, Czech football player